Roxy, Roxey, and Roxie may refer to:

Places
 Roxie, Mississippi, U.S.
 Roxie, West Virginia, U.S.

Music
 Roxy Music, the British glam rock band
 Roxy Recordings, a Swedish record label
 Roxy, a band that included Bob Segarini, released just one album in 1970
 "Roxy", a 1998 song by Girls Against Boys
 "Roxy", a 2002 song by Concrete Blonde

Theaters, nightclubs and hotels
 Roxie Theater, a movie theater in San Francisco
 Roxy Theatre, the name of several places
 Roxy Theatre (West Hollywood), a nightclub in West Hollywood, California, often referred to as "The Roxy"
 The Roxy (New York City), a nightclub on West 18th Street in New York City, now closed
 The Roxy (Covent Garden), a nightclub in London, now closed
 The Roxy, former name (until 2008) of the Buckhead Theatre in Atlanta, Georgia
 Coca-Cola Roxy, a concert venue in Cumberland, Georgia
 Roxy Hotel (disambiguation), the name of several places

Other uses
 Roxy (given name), including a list of people and characters with the name
 Roxy (cigarette), a Dutch brand
 Roxy (film), a 2018 Canadian teen romantic comedy film
 The Roxy (Portland, Oregon), a restaurant
 The Roxy (TV series), a short-lived show featuring UK music chart hits and bands
 Roxy, a brand of Quiksilver surf-inspired apparel

See also

 Roxanne (disambiguation)
 Roxxxy, a sex robot
 Roxxxy Andrews, an American drag performer
 Oxycodone, or Roxicodone or dihydrohydroxycodeinone, a semi-synthetic opioid